Henri Lehtonen (born 28 July 1980) is a Finnish former professional footballer.

References
Guardian Football
Profile at fcinter.com
https://web.archive.org/web/20090430110825/http://www.veikkausliiga.com/ennatykset_index.htm

Finnish footballers
Living people
1980 births
Veikkausliiga players
FC Inter Turku players
Association football defenders
Footballers from Turku